Colville may refer to:

Places

Canada 
Colville Lake (Northwest Territories), a lake in Northwest Territories
Colville Lake, Northwest Territories, a settlement corporation
Colville Range, a small mountain range in southwestern British Columbia

New Zealand 
Colville, New Zealand, a small town
Cape Colville, northernmost point of the Coromandel Peninsula
Colville Channel, a channel connecting the Hauraki Gulf with the Pacific Ocean

United States 
Colville, Arkansas, an unincorporated community
Colville, Kentucky, an unincorporated community
Colville, Washington, a city
Colville Indian Reservation, an Indian reservation in Washington state
Colville Island, an island in the San Juan Islands of Washington state
Colville National Forest, a U.S. National Forest
Colville River (Alaska), a river on the Arctic Ocean coast
Colville River (Washington), a tributary of the Columbia River

Other uses
Colville (surname), several people with the surname
Colville tribe, a Native American tribe in Washington state, USA
Colville Gardens, a street in London, England
Clan Colville, a Lowland Scottish clan
Colville-Okanagan language a Native American language
David Colville & Sons, a former steel company from Scotland

See also
Confederated Tribes of the Colville Reservation, a federally recognized Native American tribe in Washington state, USA
Fort Colvile, a former Hudson Bay Company trade center near the present site of Kettle Falls, Washington
Fort Colville
Colvile (disambiguation)
Coalville (disambiguation)
Colleville (disambiguation)
Coleville (disambiguation)
Colville Lake (disambiguation)
Colville River (disambiguation)